Prosoplus carinicollis is a species of beetle in the family Cerambycidae. It was described by Francis Polkinghorne Pascoe in 1864. It is known from Papua New Guinea.

References

Prosoplus
Beetles described in 1864